The Bombay plague epidemic was a bubonic plague epidemic that struck the city of Bombay (present-day Mumbai) in the late nineteenth century. The plague killed thousands, and many fled the city leading to a drastic fall in the population of the city. In September 1896, Bombay's municipal administration declared the presence of bubonic plague in the city. Ineffective protocols administered furthering the spread. By January 1897 half the population fled to the countryside.

Causes 
The bubonic plague's arrival in Bombay in the summer of 1896 was part of a deadly pandemic that had originated in China in the 1850s and continued to afflict many parts of the globe until the 1950s.

Bombay was made vulnerable by the rapid growth of the city's commerce, which led to a large influx of workers. In the 1891 census, the population of Bombay was counted to be 820,000. Most of the immigrant workers (over 70%) lived in chawls. The city services were not geared towards the well-being of the working class and various diseases were endemic to the slums. Workers in cotton mills, as one of the major social fractions within the city, and as the bedrock of its trade, played a major role in the making of this crisis. The difficulties of sanitary administration arise from the rapidity of decomposition of organic matter, the density of population, and the primitive habits of the people, which have never been brought in line with the necessities of a closely inhabited town having in certain wards a density of 700 per acre.

Detection
In September 1896, the first case of bubonic plague was detected in Mandvi by Dr. Acacio Gabriel Viegas. It spread rapidly to other parts of the city, and the death toll was estimated at 1,900 people per week through the rest of the year. By March 1897, municipal authorities believed around 20,000 people had died.

Many people fled from Bombay at this time, and in the census of 1901, the population had actually fallen to 780,000. Viegas correctly diagnosed the disease as bubonic plague and tended to patients at great personal risk. He then launched a vociferous campaign to clean up slums and exterminate rats, the carriers of the fleas which spread the plague bacterium. To confirm Viegas' findings, four teams of independent experts were brought in. With his diagnosis proving to be correct, the Governor of Bombay invited W M Haffkine, who had earlier formulated a vaccine for cholera, to do the same for the epidemic.

Those who could afford it tried to avoid the plague by moving out of the city. Jamsetji Tata tried to open up the northern suburbs to accommodate such people. The brunt of the plague was borne by mill workers. The anti-plague activities of the health department involved police searches, isolation of the sick, detention in camps of travellers and forced evacuation of residents in parts of the city. These measures were widely regarded as offensive and alarming. The extent of this outrage was demonstrated with the murder of W.C. Rand, British chairman of the Special Plague Committee. He was murdered by the Chapekar brothers, two Indian revolutionaries angered by the intrusive methods employed by the British to combat the plague in Pune.

In 1900, the mortality rate from plague was about 22 per thousand. In the same year, the corresponding rates from tuberculosis were 12 per thousand, from cholera about 14 per thousand, and about 22 per thousand from various other illnesses classified as "fevers". The plague was fearsome only because it was apparently contagious. More mundane diseases took a larger toll. In the city of Bombay, the epidemic had caused 10,606 deaths in the winter of 1896.

Responses
Authorities in Bombay, working to British Governor William Mansfield, were initially reluctant to acknowledge that the plague had reached their city, and may have been motivated by wanting to preserve Bombay's status as a trading hub. Viceroy of India, Lord Elgin, feared that harsh medical measures may cause a violent backlash against the British authorities. But as the plague worsened, Lord Hamilton, Secretary of State for India, challenged Viceroy Elgin's cautious approach.  By the spring of 1987, it was agreed that strict rules would be put in place to curb the epidemic.  Brigadier General William Gatacre of the Indian Army was put in charge, and given martial authority in the city.  The British Parliament also passed legislation, including the Epidemic Diseases Act, which gave Gatacre license for draconian actions.

In the first year of the plague, a research laboratory was set up at the JJ Hospital. It moved in 1899 to the Government House in Parel under the directorship of Haffkine. This was the beginning of the Haffkine Institute. During the plague epidemic 1897 in Bombay a medical commission of the Austrian Academy of Sciences carried out clinical, pathologic-anatomical, -histological and bacteriological investigations.

On 9 December 1898, the Bombay City Improvement Trust (CIT) was created by an act of the British Parliament. The epidemic reached its peak in the first few weeks of 1897 with rising values, with a mortality rate of 75–85%. It was entrusted with the job of creating a healthier city. One of the measures taken by the CIT was the building of roads, like Princess Street and Sydenham Road (now Mohammedali Road), which would channel the sea air into the more crowded parts of the city.

References

External links
The Plague epidemics

History of Mumbai
Epidemics in India
19th-century epidemics
1896 in India
Third plague pandemic
1890s disease outbreaks
1896 disasters in India